Pseudotrillium is a monotypic genus of flowering plant in the family Melanthiaceae. Its sole species, Pseudotrillium rivale, is commonly known as the brook wakerobin. It is endemic to the Siskiyou Mountains of southern Oregon and northern California. The Latin specific epithet rivale means “growing by streams”, with reference to a preferred habitat.

Description
Pseudotrillium rivale is a perennial, herbaceous, flowering plant that persists by means of an underground rhizome. In general appearance, it is similar to a Trillium (and at one time, it belonged to that genus). It has a whorl of three bracts (leaves) and a single trimerous flower with three sepals, three petals, two whorls of three stamens each, and three carpels (fused into a single ovary with three stigmas). It differs from Trillium in that it has spotted petals, leathery leaves with a cordate base, and a continuously elongating pedicel. At the onset of anthesis, the pedicel rises above the leaves, but once the flower is pollinated, the pedicel elongates and declines below the leaves.

The leaves are glossy blue-green with conspicuous silvery veins.

Taxonomy
Pseudotrillium rivale was first described as Trillium rivale by American botanist Sereno Watson in 1885. Its type specimen was collected in 1880 at Big Flat in the Siskiyou Mountains, thirty miles east of Crescent City, California. Watson compared the new species to the eastern Trillium nivale, "which it much resembles in habit." Presumably he was referring to the tendency of the pedicel to decline below the leaves after pollination, a common habit of both species.

Based on morphology and molecular evidence, Trillium rivale was segregated into a monotypic genus by Susan B. Farmer in 2002. For this purpose, Farmer simultaneously described the names Pseudotrillium and Pseudotrillium rivale. , the name Pseudotrillium rivale  is widely recognized.

Pseudotrillium is a member of tribe Parideae. It is sister to the remainder of Parideae, a clade that includes Paris and Trillium. Based on molecular phylogenetic studies, Pseudotrillium rivale is the first diverging (basal) branch of Parideae, a result that is well supported. Historically, studies that omit this taxon have given strikingly different results, suggesting that "Pseudotrillium could hold the key to phylogenetic studies."

Distribution
Pseudotrillium rivale is endemic to the Siskiyou Mountains of southern Oregon (Josephine, Coos, Douglas, and Curry counties) and northern California (Siskiyou and Del Norte counties), usually on soils of ultramafic origin, such as serpentine. California plants, growing in a dense damp woods, are larger than Oregon plants in all respects with a strong tendency to produce colored flowers. In contrast, Oregon plants found in dry open woods are tiny plants with freckled white flowers.

Ecology
Pseudotrillium rivale flowers April to June, with northern California plants flowering somewhat later than those in Oregon. At higher elevations, the onset of flowering may be delayed until early May. After flowering, the entire plant may enlarge and become more robust and turgid with very glossy leaves. Initially the pedicel is of moderate length but it soon begins to lengthen and twist in a most unusual way. If fertilization is successful, the pedicel arches downward so that the fruit comes in contact with the soil. By mid-July, the entire plant withers and goes dormant.

Uses
Under its former name, Trillium rivale, this plant has gained the Royal Horticultural Society's Award of Garden Merit.

References

Bibliography

External links
 
 Calphotos Photo gallery, University of California: Trillium rivale

Flora of the Klamath Mountains
Flora of California
Flora of Oregon
Monotypic Liliales genera
Melanthiaceae genera
Plants described in 1885